The Eastern District is a district of the Virginia High School League.  The schools in the Eastern District compete in the 6A, 5A, and 4A divisions.

The members of the Eastern District are all the public schools in Norfolk City and Portsmouth City.

Member schools
Churchland High School of Portsmouth, Virginia
Granby High School of Norfolk, Virginia
Lake Taylor High School of Norfolk, Virginia
Manor High School of Portsmouth, Virginia
Maury High School of Norfolk, Virginia
I.C. Norcom High School of Portsmouth, Virginia
Norview High School of Norfolk, Virginia
Booker T. Washington High School of Norfolk, Virginia

External links
 VHSL-Reference

Sports in Hampton Roads
Education in Portsmouth, Virginia
Virginia High School League
Sports in Norfolk, Virginia